The O'Neill Municipal Airport  (John L. Baker Field) is two miles northwest of O'Neill, in Holt County, Nebraska. It is owned by the O'Neill Airport Authority. The FAA's National Plan of Integrated Airport Systems for 2009–2013 categorized it as a general aviation facility.

The field is named after John L. Baker, a native of O'Neil who was a fighter pilot in the Korean War, the United States Department of Justice's first air-crash attorney, counsel to the United States Senate, and the Federal Aviation Administration as Assistant Systems Administrator for General Aviation. He also served as president of both the AOPA and International Council of Aircraft Owner and Pilot Associations (IAOPA), the latter of which saw him represent 37 countries in the ICAO.

Facilities
It has 2 runways. 13/31 is 4,408 by 75 feet (1,344 x 23 m) concrete. 04/22 is 3,200 by 60 feet (975 x 18 m). 

In the year ending April 24, 2018, the airport averaged 20 aircraft operations per day: 99% general aviation and <1% military. 27 aircraft were then based at the airport: 25 single-engine and 2 multi-engine.

References

External links 
 O'Neill (ONL) at Nebraska Department of Aeronautics
 Aerial photo as of 21 April 2000 from USGS The National Map
 

Airports in Nebraska
Buildings and structures in Holt County, Nebraska